The Gigantes del Cibao (English: Cibao giants) are a baseball team that plays in the Dominican Winter League. The team was founded in 1996 as Gigantes del Noroeste then with a change of ownership the name was changed several times, being called Pollos del Cibao, and Pollos Baseball Club.

History 
 At the start of the professional Dominican Republic baseball season in 1995, the League of Professional Baseball reported that for the 1996 season it planned to create another franchise to expand the league, to that date there were only five teams: Tigres del Licey, Aguilas Cibaeñas, Leones del Escogido, Estrellas Orientales and Toros del Este.

Thus, a group led by former baseball major league player Julián Javier, who had arranged for the appointment or purchase of the franchise, accompanied by José Aníbal García, Ysócrates Peña, Abraham Abukarma who formed a committee, this committee met with Siquió NG de la Rosa getting the necessary partners to invest in the project.

The company was established as Nordeste Baseball Club, which has 34 founding members from the different provinces of the Cibao region. Among the members are: Carlos Eliseo Negrin, Celso Ventura, Miguel Angel Almanzar, Rafael Almanzar, José Adolfo Herrera and others.

In 1996, they were granted permission to operate and immediately began to put the old Estadio Julian Javier in conditions for baseball.

The first three years of operation of the team were in the hands of the Dominican Baseball League who held the guidance and advice of the steps to be followed for the proper functioning of the newly established team.

In 1999, due to a disastrous season in which the team broke the record for fewest games won, 9–51, controlling shareholders decided to relist the team and that is how it was handed to Julio Hazim, who immediately renamed the team as Pollos del Cibao, staying for two years as head of the administration team. It was in the first season of the new ownership when Hazim fixed part of the stands, stadium roof and drainage. That same year there was a new sale, this time to former big leaguer Stanley Javier, who decided to return to the previous name, but now it was no longer the Gigantes of nordeste (Giants of Northeast) but: Gigantes del Cibao. From 2004–2012, the team was under the direction of the Genao family. Since 2013, the team went on to be managed by the Rizek Family.

Estadio Julian Javier

The Estadio Julian Javier is the home of Gigantes del Cibao, located in San Francisco de Macoris, Dominican Republic. The stadium was built for the 1975 National Games, and has capacity for 12,000 people. The stadium is named in honor of former MLB Dominican baseball player Julian Javier.

Presidents
The Gigantes have had several presidents from its founding to the present day:
Siquio NG de la Rosa (Founding President)
José Anibal Garcia
Angel Miguel Almanzar
Carlos Eliseo Negrin
Julio Hazim
Stanley Javier
Alberto Genao
Laurentino Genao
Samir Rizek Sued

Rivalries

 Aguilas Cibaeñas
The Gigantes have a great sporting rivalry with Aguilas Cibaeñas due to the proximity of the two cities. The two teams are in the same region and always has been the habit that the schedule for the opening match is always played between these two, just changing the venue each year.

The games between Gigantes and Aguilas are a great support among fans because the fervor is at his best.
 Tigres del Licey
Another great sporting rivalry is with the Tigres del Licey, this has developed because of the three finals that the team has participated, 2 were against the Tigres del Licey. In fact, the first lost game in the history of the Gigantes was against Licey.

Another factor is that in the final series of the 2008–09 season where these two had clashed scuffles between players, fans and even referees which ultimately led to the Gigantes play home games in the Estadio Quisqueya, home of the Tigres. Clashes between Gigantes and Tigres are always a lot of expectation in San Francisco de Macoris since the fans do their best to make the Tigres uncomfortable.

Fans
The Gigantes have the fourth largest number of fans in the league below Tigres del Licey, Águilas Cibaeñas y Leones del Escogido and ahead of Toros del Este and Estrellas Orientales.

The team's fans are known to be very fervent fans and full of passion. In the Estadio Julian Javier there have always been marching bands, flags, horns, whistles and chants.

Lifetime record

Managers

Outstanding players

In his short time the Gigantes have achieved quality players and presence in the major leagues.

Players like:

Jose Reyes
Albert Pujols
Plácido Polanco
Kendry Morales
Joel Peralta
Nelson Cruz
Román Colón
Pedro Strop
Ramón Santiago
Erick Almonte
Alexi Casilla
Wilson Valdez
Wilson Betemit
Marcell Ozuna
Leury Garcia
Brayan Peña
Jean Segura
Carlos Peguero
John Halama
Scott Spiezio
Aquilino Lopez
Darío Veras
Juan Pérez
Mark Trumbo
Jimmy Paredes
Antonio Bastardo
Pedro Féliz
Ty Wigginton

And many others.

2022 Caribbean Series Roster

References

External links
 Official Page

San Francisco de Macorís
Baseball teams in the Dominican Republic
Baseball teams established in 1996
1996 establishments in the Dominican Republic